Višnja Vuletić Popović (born 7 January 1982) is a Serbian tennis coach and former professional tennis player.

Vuletić made her only WTA Tour main draw appearance at the 2000 EuroTel Slovak Indoor, partnering Belarusian Olga Barabanschikova in the doubles. But First Round lost Slovakian Ľubomíra Kurhajcová and Eva Fislová.

After Vuletić retired from professional tennis, she continued to work as a tennis coach. She works with players from all over the world, including WTA players, with the tennis academy that she names.

ITF finals

Doubles: 3 (1–2)

References

External links
 
 

1982 births
Living people
Tennis players from Belgrade
Serbian female tennis players
Serbia and Montenegro female tennis players
Serbian tennis coaches